Majestic Records was a mid-20th century record label based in New York City, incorporated in 1945 as a wholly-owned subsidiary of Majestic Radio & Television. The label enjoyed its greatest commercial success in the 1940s until expansion and supplying its distributors with pressings of discs created financial problems; the label folded in 1948.

For a time in the 1940s, bandleader Ben Selvin headed the label's artists & repertory. The company was headed by former New York City mayor Jimmy Walker.

Artists who recorded on Majestic included: Jimmie Lunceford, Louis Prima, Bud Freeman, Slim Bryant, Eddy Howard, the Four Shades of Rhythm, the DeMarco Sisters, the Three Suns, Thelma Carpenter, Georgia Gibbs, Mildred Bailey, George Olsen, George Paxton and His Orchestra, Ray McKinley, Phil Regan, the Jones Brothers, Ella Logan, Jan Peerce, Jane Froman, Leon McAuliffe, Foy Willing and the Riders of the Purple Sage, Riley Shepard,  the Merry Macs, and Bob Johnston.

See also
 List of record labels

References

External links
Spotlight on Majestic Records
Majestic Records on the Internet Archive's Great 78 Project

 
American record labels
Jazz record labels
Record labels disestablished in 1948